Wendel Hipler was born in Neuenstein in 1465.  As a nobleman, Hipler, nonetheless, sided with the insurgents during the peasant uprising in Franconia in 1525,  Hipler was the primary author of the "Heilbronn program."  He died in 1526.

References

1465 births
1526 deaths
People from Hohenlohe (district)
German revolutionaries
Military personnel of the Holy Roman Empire